Els Aarne (correctly Else, Els Paemurru; 30 March 1917 – 14 June 1995) was an Estonian composer and pedagogue.

She was born in Makiivka, Russian Empire (now Ukraine) and studied at Tallinn Conservatory, graduating as a music teacher in 1939, in 1942 as pianist and in 1946 as composer under Heino Eller. Els was famous, among other things, as a chamber music composer (preferring to compose for violoncello and double-bass); in addition, she wrote two symphonies.

Her son is a cellist and politician .

References

1917 births
1995 deaths
People from Makiivka
20th-century Estonian composers
Estonian Academy of Music and Theatre alumni